A Certain Ratio (abbreviated as ACR) are an English post-punk band formed in 1977 in Flixton, Greater Manchester by Peter Terrell (guitar, electronics) and Simon Topping (vocals, trumpet), with additional members Jez Kerr (bass, vocals), Martin Moscrop (trumpet, guitar), Donald Johnson (drums), and Martha Tilson (vocals) joining soon after. 

Among the first white indie groups to draw heavy influence from funk as well as disco and Latin percussion, the band were among the first to debut on Tony Wilson's Factory Records in 1979 with "All Night Party," produced by Martin Hannett. During ACR's early years with Factory, they scored seven Top Ten U.K. independent releases, highlighted by "Flight" and "Waterline," and released five albums beginning with The Graveyard and the Ballroom (1979).

Following late 1980s and early 1990s phases with major-label A&M and Rob Gretton's independent Robs Records, ACR were intermittently active. They returned to the studio for the 2008 album Mind Made Up and since then have continued to perform, with their back catalogue recirculated through an arrangement with Mute Records. ACR continued to perform into the 2020s, and during 2017-2019 expanded, reissued, and anthologised their catalogue once more, this time through Mute Records, through whom they continue to release new recordings.

History

The Factory era
The band was formed by singer Simon Topping and guitar/electronics player Peter Terrell, who after initially performing as a duo, were soon joined by bass guitarist/vocalist Jez Kerr and then guitarist/trumpeter Martin Moscrop, the band playing without a drummer for a year. The band's name is taken from the lyric of Brian Eno's song "The True Wheel" from the 1974 album Taking Tiger Mountain (By Strategy). Their early influences included the Velvet Underground, Kraftwerk, The Pop Group, Pere Ubu, Wire, Brian Eno, Parliament, Funkadelic, and Earth, Wind and Fire. A Certain Ratio, by early 1979, were “beginning to forge links between post-punk industrial and dance-floor funk” (Tony Wilson, Factory Records).

ACR's line-up, with a dark bass-heavy industrial/funk sound, recorded the group's debut single, "All Night Party", released by Factory Records in September 1979 (the label's first single artist release), with Factory label boss Tony Wilson also becoming their manager, proclaiming the band to be "the new Sex Pistols". The 5,000 copies that were pressed soon sold out. 

On 1 October 1979 the band recorded a session for John Peel's BBC Radio 1 show, by which time Donald Johnson had joined the band on drums. The session included “Do The Du”, “All Night Party”, “Flight” and “Choir” and was broadcast on 17 October.

ACR played their first tour of bigger venues as the support act on the Talking Heads UK tour in December 1979. There are suggestions that watching ACR perform encouraged David Byrne and Talking Heads to go in a more funky musical direction.

The Graveyard and The Ballroom 
Their next release, the cassette-only compilation of demos and live tracks The Graveyard and the Ballroom, was released in January 1980. The Graveyard side of the album was recorded at Graveyard Studios, Prestwich, Manchester in September 1979, while The Ballroom side was a live recording of ACR’s October 1979 gig at the Electric Ballroom, London.

Martin Moscrop started a second band in 1980, Swamp Children (the name later changed to Kalima), that would go on to share several members with A Certain Ratio. 

In July 1980, the band's second single, a cover version of Banbarra's "Shack Up", recorded at a cost of £50, was released. This was followed in November with "Flight" on 12", which saw their first placing on the UK Independent Chart, peaking at no. 7. "Shack Up" got a US release in January 1981, going on to peak at no. 46 on the Billboard Dance Club Songs chart, and the band expanded to a six-piece with the addition of former Occult Chemistry singer Martha Tilson, with Topping focusing on trumpet and percussion.

To Each... 
The expanded lineup recorded their debut studio album, To Each... The album was recorded in New Jersey with Martin Hannett producing, and released in May 1981. It topped the UK Independent Chart. To Each… represents a development in the ACR sound from the raw harshness of The Graveyard and The Ballroom to a percussion-based post-punk funk.

They recorded a second Peel session in June 1981. The session, which included “Knife Slits Water”, “Day One” and “Skipscada”, was broadcast on 2 July. 

ACR finished the year with the single "Waterline", which was another top 10 indie chart hit. “Waterline” was the first record self-produced by the group. All of ACR’s previous recordings had been produced by Factory’s Martin Hannett but the band wanted a different sound. “We thought he was making us sound too much like Joy Division” (Martin Moscrop, ACR). “Waterline” has a more funk and jazz sound than earlier recordings.

Sextet 
The band's third album, Sextet, followed in January 1982, now incorporating elements of acid jazz, funk, and latin music, and again topped the indie albums chart, also peaking at no. 55 on the UK Albums Chart. The band’s recent stay in New York had increased the Latin, jazz and Cuban percussion influences in their music. Sextet was the first album that was self-produced by ACR and is closer to the sound the band wanted and their live performances. ACR rate Sextet as one of their stand out albums.  

In February 1982 they released the dub reggae single "Abracadubra" under the pseudonym 'Sir Horatio'. ACR had further indie charting singles that year with "Guess Who?" and "Knife Slits Water". 

The group recorded a third Peel session in November, now without Tilson, but with Andy Connell added on keyboards and percussion. This session saw the group show more of a jazz influence in the three tracks (“Who’s To Say”, “Piu Lento” and “Touch”) which were broadcast on the John Peel show of 1 December 1982.

I'd Like to See You Again
The band's fourth album, I'd Like to See You Again, was released in November 1982, reaching no. 2 on the indie albums chart. “The new music offered disciplined latin disco, inspired in part by Cameo.”  

The album received mixed reviews. “ACR aren’t sounding like ACR anymore so much as the latest New York disco imports” (New Musical Express, 1982) “I’d Like to See You Again represented an aesthetic low. In striving for a more accessible sound, the group had become overly clinical.” (Adrian Thrills, New Musical Express, August 1985)

The band's two founding members, Topping and Terrell, left the band in late 1982. Simon Topping recorded a solo single before forming T-Coy with former Quando Quango (and later M People member) Mike Pickering.

I Need Someone Tonight 
The band regrouped and returned in October 1983 with the single "I Need Someone Tonight" (with Carol McKenzie on vocals), another top-10 indie hit.

Life's a Scream & Wild Party 
Tony Quigley (of Kalima) joined on saxophone, and the band released three singles in late 1984 and 1985 - "Life's a Scream" (December 1984), "Brazilia" (February 1985) and "Wild Party" (June 1985).

The Old And The New 
The Old and the New, a compilation album bringing together many of the non-album singles released from ACR's formation up to the end of 1985, came out on Factory records in January 1986.  

The tracks “Flight”, “And Then Again” and “Blown Away” were taken from a 12” released in 1980. “Do The Du” and “Fox” were lifted from a single that came out in 1981. “Life’s A Scream” and “There’s Only This” were the two tracks on a 12” released at the end of 1984. “Wild Party” and “Sounds Like Something Dirty” originally appeared as a 12” in 1985. An additional 7” single that made the centrepiece of the front cover of the compilation album included “Shack Up”, which came out as a single in 1980, and “Thin Boys”, which was the b-side on ACR’s very first single.

Connell left in 1985 to form Swing Out Sister, whose singer Corinne Drewery guested on ACR's next album, Force (1986), their last for Factory.

Force 
Force was released on Factory records in November 1986.  

The album received good reviews from the music press. In January 1986 ACR performed live on Channel 4 music show The Tube.

1989–1997: A&M, Rob's Records, and Creation Records
New releases were sparse during the next two years. Dojo Records released a 1985 live recording as Live in America in February 1987, and Italian label Materiali Sonori released the 'Greeting Four' EP five months later. The band signed with A&M Records in 1987, the lineup now Kerr, Moscrop, Johnson, and Quigley, the first releases for the label the singles "The Big E" and "Backs to the Wall", which preceded the album  Good Together, released in September 1989. A 50–minute recording of a live show from London was broadcast on British television in October. They also set up their own SoundStation studio in Manchester. The band's only significant chart success with A&M came with the 1990 single "Won't Stop Loving You", which peaked at no. 55 on the UK Singles Chart, although the first two singles also made the lower reaches of the chart. The album acr:mcr followed, but the band were then dropped from the label.

In 1991, they signed with Rob's Records, owned by New Order manager and former Factory Records partner Rob Gretton, releasing a string of singles and the album Up in Dowsnville (1992). In 1994, Creation Records began reissuing the band's albums on the Rev-Ola sub-label, and also released two EPs of remixes. The band's first original material for almost three years was released in August 1996, with the live Soundstation Volume 1 EP, followed in November with the Change the Station album. A second Soundstation live EP was released in March 1997, the band's last release for some time.

In 2002 Soul Jazz Records reissued the albums with bonus tracks (but using the same masters as the Creation editions). Further re-issues and a live recording from 1980 were also made available on the LTM label.

2000s return
The band played occasional live shows between 2002 and 2007, and performed in the US for the first time since 1985 on 16 November 2008, headlining the Part Time Punks festival at The Echo in Los Angeles, releasing a new album Mind Made Up the same month, on French label Le Maquis. They performed a headline set at the Offset Festival in London in September 2009, playing alongside fellow post-punk artists The Slits, following a one-off live performance commemorating Factory Records in Dublin, in March that year. They performed at the Plan K, Molenbeek in West Brussels on 12 December 2009 as part of the event, 'A Factory Night (And Then Again)'. This event also featured Section 25, The Wake, The Names and Biting Tongues. Towards the end of 2009, the band announced a live appearance at a fund-raising event at Brighton's Concorde 2 venue on 7 March 2010. Their 2008 album, Mind Made Up was re-issued via LTM Recordings during 2010, along with a redux version of the 1986 set, Force.

In May 2011, they performed on The Satellite Stage at Friends of Mine Festival at Capesthorne Hall near Macclesfield, and were introduced by their friend Terry Christian.

In 2018, Mute Records began reissuing their back catalogue, they released acr:set, an album of mostly old tracks with two new tracks, one ("Dirty Boy") recorded with Barry Adamson and featuring a recording of Tony Wilson, and undertook a tour of the UK with dates in Ireland and Finland. In November 2018 they recorded a session for Marc Riley's BBC Radio 6 Music show, performing new song "Dirty Boy", "Mickey Way", and "Flight".

They released a box set, a 40th anniversary retrospective named acr:box, in May 2019 and toured in support of this. It consists of 53 songs providing a detailed career overview to date.
After collecting their past on 2019's ACR: Box collection, A Certain Ratio has released ACR Loco in September 2020. Their first album of new material in 12 years. Featuring three original band members – Jez Kerr, Martin Moscrop, and Donald Johnson – along with members of the band's current live ensemble. Loco finds the band in an expansive, jazzy, danceable state of mind. Musically, A Certain Ratio sound far removed from their post-punk roots now, relying more on their sound's dance and funk elements.

In film
"Wild Party" was used in the soundtrack of the 1985 film Letter to Brezhnev. "Shack Up" was used in the soundtrack of Patrice Chéreau's Intimacy (2001). The band are featured in the 2002 film 24 Hour Party People where Tony Wilson (played by Steve Coogan) describes them as "having all the energy of Joy Division but better clothes". Martin Moscrop was musical supervisor of the film.

Discography

The Graveyard and the Ballroom (1980)
To Each... (1981)
Sextet (1982)
I'd Like to See You Again (1982)
Force (1986)
Good Together (1989)
acr:mcr (1990)
Up in Downsville (1992)
Change the Station (1997)
Mind Made Up (2008)
ACR LOCO (2020)
1982 (2023)

References

External links
 
 
 
 
 ACR at LTM Recordings

English funk musical groups
English new wave musical groups
English post-punk music groups
Musical groups established in 1977
Musical groups from Greater Manchester
Dance-rock musical groups
Creation Records artists
Factory Records artists
Factory Benelux artists